New Xanagas is a village in Ghanzi District of Botswana. It is located western part of the district. New Xanagas has a primary school and the population was 540 in 2001 census.

References

Ghanzi District
Villages in Botswana